Events in 2018 in Japanese television.

Events
 April 8
 AKB48 Show! changes its timeslot on BS Premium from Saturday 23:45 JST to Sunday 23:00 JST.
 May 3
 Boruto: Naruto Next Generations changes its timeslot on TV Tokyo from Wednesday 17:55 JST to Thursday 19:25 JST.
 September 2
 AKB48 Show! changes its timeslot once again in BS Premium and starts 10 minutes earlier, at Sunday 22:50 JST.
 October 7
 Boruto: Naruto Next Generations changes its timeslot on TV Tokyo from Thursday 19:25 JST to Sunday 17:30 JST.
 Pokémon Sun & Moon changes its timeslot on TV Tokyo from Thursday 18:55 JST to Sunday 18:00 JST.

Ongoing

New shows and returning series

Ending

Sports Events

Special events and milestone episodes

Deaths

See also
 2018 in anime
 2018 in Japan
 2018 in Japanese music
 List of Japanese films of 2018

References